Torshab or Turushab or Torsh Ab may refer to:
Torshab-e Bala, Kerman Province
Torshab, Lorestan
Torshab, Sistan and Baluchestan
Torsh Ab, alternate name of Toros Ab, South Khorasan Province